Diffusing-wave spectroscopy (DWS) is an optical technique derived from dynamic light scattering (DLS) that studies the dynamics of scattered light in the limit of strong multiple scattering. It has been widely used in the past to study colloidal suspensions, emulsions, foams, gels, biological media and other forms of soft matter. If carefully calibrated, DWS allows the quantitative measurement of microscopic motion in a soft material, from which the rheological properties of the complex medium can be extracted via the microrheology approach.

One-speckle diffusing-wave spectroscopy
Laser light is sent to the sample and the outcoming transmitted or backscattered light is detected by an optoelectric sensor. The light intensity detected is the result of the interference of all the optical waves coming from the different light paths.

The signal is analysed by calculating the intensity autocorrelation function called g2. 

For the case of non-interacting particles suspended in a (complex) fluid a direct relation between g2-1  and the mean squared displacement of the particles <Δr2> can be established. Let's note P(s) the probability density function (PDF) of the photon path length s. The relation can be written as follows:

For simple cell geometries, it is thus possible to calculate the mean squared displacement of the particles <Δr2> from the measured g2-1 values analytically. For example, for the backscattering geometry, an infinitely thick cell, large laser spot illumination and detection of photons coming from the center of the spot, the relationship between g2-1 and <Δr2> is:

, γ value is around 2.

For less thick cells and in transmission, the relationship depends also on l* (the transport length).

For quasi-transparent cells, an angle-independent variant method called Cavity Amplified Scattering Spectroscopy makes use of an integrating sphere to isotropically probe samples from all directions, elongating photon paths through the sample in the process, allowing for the study of low turbidity samples under the DWS formalism.

Multispeckle Diffusing-Wave Spectroscopy (MSDWS)

This technique either uses a camera to detect many speckle grains (see speckle pattern) or a ground glass to create a large number of speckle realizations (Echo-DWS ). In both cases an average over a large number of statistically independent intensity values is obtained, allowing a much faster data acquisition time.

MSDWS is particularly adapted for the study of slow dynamics and non ergodic media. Echo-DWS allows seamless integration of MSDWS in a traditional DWS-scheme with superior temporal resolution down to 12 ns. Camera based adaptive image processing allows online measurement of particle dynamics for example during drying.

References

External links
Diffusing Wave Spectroscopy Overview with video
Diffusing Wave Spectroscopy Overview with Animations
Particle Sizing using Diffusing Wave Spectroscopy

Spectroscopy
Soft matter